The 1995 AFL season was the 99th season of the Australian Football League (AFL), the highest level senior Australian rules football competition in Australia, which was known as the Victorian Football League until 1989.

The league expanded to sixteen clubs, with the newly established Fremantle Football Club, based in Fremantle, Western Australia, joining the league. The season ran from 31 March until 30 September, and comprised a 22-game home-and-away season followed by a finals series featuring the top eight clubs. 

The premiership was won by the Carlton Football Club for the 16th time, after it defeated  by 61 points in the 1995 AFL Grand Final.

AFL Draft
See 1995 AFL Draft.

Ansett Australia Cup

 defeated  14.9 (93) to 8.15 (63) in the final.

Premiership season

Round 1

Round 2

Round 3

Round 4

This was the first ANZAC Day clash held between Collingwood and Essendon which famously ended in a draw.
The crowd of 94,825 for the ANZAC Day clash was, and still is, the second highest crowd for a home and away game in AFL history.

Round 5

Round 6

Round 7

Round 8

Round 9

Round 10

Round 11

Round 12

Round 13

Round 14

Round 15

Round 16
*Brisbane Bears came from 45 points down at 3 quarter time to beat Hawthorn by 7 points.

Round 17

Round 18

Round 19

Round 20

Round 21

Tony Lockett kicked both his 100th goal for the season and his 1000th career goal during the Sydney Swans v Fremantle game at the Sydney Cricket Ground.
The Brisbane Bears vs Essendon Bombers game at the Gabba is the first ever night game in Brisbane.

Round 22

Ladder

Ladder progression

Finals

Qualifying Finals

Semi finals

Preliminary Finals

Grand final

Awards

Notable events
The Fremantle Dockers made their debut in the competition.
They played their first game against  at the MCG and won their first game against  at Whitten Oval.
 won a record 16th premiership, winning twenty games for the home-and-away season, also a new record (subsequently surpassed by Essendon in 2000 and Geelong in 2008). They won their 16th consecutive match in the grand final, comfortably beating  21.15 (141) to 11.14 (80).
Amidst these records, they also suffered the rare ignominy of losing to the bottom team while atop the ladder in their Round 9 game. In this game, they failed to score a goal in the first half and became the fifth (and to date last) premier team to have kicked a season's lowest score (also in 1923, 1968, 1970 and 1992).
 reached the finals for the first time since 1982, finishing 3rd and making the preliminary finals.
They won their first 7 games, winning their first five games for the first time since the early 1980s.
They were on top of the ladder for the first time since 1982 (from rounds 9 to 12).
 made an exceptional late season charge to reach the finals for the first time in team history.
The Bears sat 14th after 15 rounds with a win–loss record of 4–11 and a percentage of 83.2%.
In Round 16 at the Gabba against Hawthorn, the Bears trailed Hawthorn by 45 points at three-quarter time, but scored nine goals to one in the final quarter to pull off a seven-point victory. It remains the largest three-quarter time deficit ever overcome in VFL/AFL history. The Bears were still in 14th place at the end of the game.
Brisbane won its next two games against bottom eight opposition to reach 12th place, but were to face Carlton, Richmond and Essendon (who then held the top three places respectively) in the following three weeks. Against all odds, Brisbane lost to Carlton by only 14 points, then thrashed the Tigers by 77 points and beat Essendon by 32 points.
At the start of the final round, Melbourne, Collingwood and Brisbane sat 8th, 9th and 10th respectively, all on nine wins. Brisbane needed to beat Melbourne, and rely on Sydney (13th place) beating Collingwood to reach the finals. Brisbane beat Melbourne by 21 points on Friday night, then watched on Sunday as Sydney scored eight final quarter goals to overhaul Collingwood by 23 points.
The Bears finals appearance was short-lived, as the eventual premiers Carlton beat them by 13 points in the first week of the finals in a very high standard game.
However, the 10 wins and 12 losses of Brisbane in 1995, remains the worst record of a team in VFL/AFL history which qualified a team for the finals (excluding those seasons where more than half of teams qualified for the finals).
, VFL and State of Origin legend Ted Whitten died.
He had been given a "lap of honour" during the 1995 State of Origin match between Victoria and South Australia.
The Western Oval would be renamed the Whitten Oval in his memory.
 missed out on the finals for the first time since the early 1980s.
The team finished second last, failing to register a win for its last seven matches.
 continued to decline, failing to register a win from round 9 and finished on the bottom of the ladder with just 2 wins.
There were many significant changes to incumbent AFL team coaches:
After round 19, the  coach Bernie Quinlan was sacked and replaced by caretaker coach Alan McConnell for the remaining three games of their season (Michael Nunan later was signed as coach for 1996). 
The first ever (and to date only) AFL game was played at Bruce Stadium in Canberra, between Fitzroy and West Coast Eagles in round 9.

References
 1995 Season - AFL Tables

 
AFL season
Australian Football League seasons